Castoldi may refer to:

Business
Castoldi (company), a French automobile manufacturing company

People
Mario Castoldi (1888-1968), an Italian aeronautical engineer and aircraft designer
Ray Castoldi (b. ?), an American organist noted for playing at sports events